Bermejo Airport  is an airport serving Bermejo, a city in the Tarija Department of Bolivia.

Bermejo is in a broad open valley of the Cordillera Central range in southern Bolivia, with distant rising terrain to the west and east.

The Bermejo non-directional beacon (Ident: BJO) is located on the field.

See also

Transport in Bolivia
List of airports in Bolivia

References

External links
OpenStreetMap - Bermejo
OurAirports - Bermejo
SkyVector - Bermejo

Airports in Tarija Department